Carl Severin Wigert (1871–1941) was a Swedish mathematician who created Stieltjes–Wigert polynomials and worked on the divisor function, including correctly describing its maximal order of growth. Wigert proved that

Selected publications

References 

Swedish mathematicians
1871 births
1941 deaths